Kalutara District (Kaḷuttuṟai Māvaṭṭam) is one of the 25 districts of Sri Lanka, the second level administrative division of the country. The district is administered by a District Secretariat headed by a District Secretary (previously known as a Government Agent) appointed by the central government of Sri Lanka. The capital of the district is the city of Kalutara
.

Geography
It is bounded by Colombo District from north, Ratnapura District from east, Galle District from south, and by the Indian Ocean from west.

Administrative units
Kalutara District is divided into 14 Divisional Secretary's Division (DS Divisions), each headed by a Divisional Secretary (previously known as an Assistant Government Agent). The DS Divisions are further sub-divided into 762 Grama Niladhari Divisions (GN Divisions).

Demographics

Population
Kalutara District's population was 1,217,260 in 2012. The majority of the population are Sinhalese, with a minority Sri Lankan Moor and Sri Lankan Tamil population.

Ethnicity

Religion

See also
Kithulgoda

Notes

References

External links

 

 
Districts of Sri Lanka